Lichfield House may refer to the following houses in London:
 Lichfield House, Richmond, former residence of the Bishop of Lichfield on the site now occupied by Lichfield Court apartments
 Lichfield House, Whitehall, 1680s residence of the Countess of Lichfield, now the back part of 10 Downing Street
 Lichfield House, St James's, 1830s residence of Thomas Anson, 1st Earl of Lichfield; where the Lichfield House Compact was agreed.